Marshall Islands–Spain relations are the bilateral and diplomatic relations between these two countries. The Spanish embassy in Manila, Philippines, is accredited for the Marshall Islands, plus Spain has an honorary consulate in Majuro. The Marshall Islands have an embassy in Madrid and a consulate in Barcelona.

Historical relations 

The first European to reach the archipelago was the Spanish explorer Alonso de Salazar in 1526, during García Jofre de Loaísa's expedition.

Another Spanish explorer, Álvaro de Saavedra Cerón, commanded the ship  Florida , conquered them in the name of the King of Spain in 1528. He called this group of islands "Los Pintados" . He was followed by numerous Spanish expeditions. Ships like the "San Jerónimo", "Los Reyes", "Todos los Santos" visited the islands in different years.

Diplomatic relations 
The Marshall Islands established diplomatic relations with Spain on 8 October 1991. The non-resident Ambassador of Spain in the Republic of the Marshall Islands is based in Manila.

In August 2012, the ministerial order establishing an Honorary Consular Office of Spain in the Republic of the Marshall Islands, based in Majuro, was published in the B.O.E. In August 2013 the Ministry of Foreign Affairs gives the Exequatur to the first Honorary Consul of Spain in Majuro.

Cooperation 
Spain provided financing of 30,000 euros to the Palau Ministry of Education for the organization of the meeting, in November 2011, in Koror of Directors of Education of the Member States of the Pacific Islands Forum for the preparation of a regional education framework, attended by representatives of the Marshall Islands. 

Also in 2008 Spain contributed €3.4 million to a project to improve computer networks and to create a consortium of universities that promote knowledge sharing in the region of the Group of Small Island States on track of development- Small Island Developing States (SIDS) -, of which the Republic of the Marshall Islands is a part. 

On the occasion of the celebration in Majuro of the annual summit of the PICF, Spain granted a grant of 20,000 euros to support the organizational effort of the Government of the Republic of the Marshall Islands. Likewise, the exhibition “Pacific: Spain and the Adventure of the South Sea” was organized in parallel to the summit, inaugurated on 4 September at the College of the Marshall Islands, and inaugurated by the Marshalés Minister of Foreign Affairs, Phillip Muller, the EU Commissioner for Climate Change, Connie Hedegaard, and the Spanish delegation. The exhibition, which had great success among the local population, has been donated as a permanent exhibition to the aforementioned university institute.

See also
 Foreign relations of the Marshall Islands
 Foreign relations of Spain

References 

 
Spain
Marshall Islands